Ecleidira Maria Fonseca Paes (born 30 June 1968), known professionally as Dira Paes, is a Brazilian actress and television presenter. Among the numerous awards and nominations she has received, Paes won the Best Actress and Best Supporting Actress at the Festival de Brasília for Corisco & Dadá and Anahy de las Misiones, respectively, as well as the Best Actress at the 2013 Grande Prêmio do Cinema Brasileiro for À Beira do Caminho.

Biography
Born in Abaetetuba, in the interior of Pará, and raised in Belém, Paes had a very simple childhood with 7 siblings. She always wanted to be an actress, despite financial difficulties, she did not give up on her dream. She is of Native Brazilian, Portuguese, and African descent, and identifies herself as Amazonian cabocla.

Selected filmography

TV
 Carne de Sol (1986) 
 Ele , O boto (1987)
 Araponga (1990)
 Irmãos Coragem (1995)
 Dona Flor e Seus Dois Maridos (1998)
 Chiquinha Gonzaga (1999)
 Força de um Desejo (1999)
 A Diarista (2004–2007)
 Um Só Coração (2004)
 Casos e Acasos (2008)
 India – A Love Story (2009)
 Zorra Total (2009)
 Casseta e Planeta, Urgente (2009)
 Ti Ti Ti (2010)
 Fina Estampa (2011)
 As Brasileiras (2012)
 Salve Jorge (2012)
 O Rebu (2014)
 Amores Roubados (2014)
 Criança Esperança (2015–2017)
 Babilônia (2015) 
 Velho Chico (2016)
 Segredos de Justiça (2017)

Films

References

External links

1969 births
Living people
People from Pará
Afro-Brazilian people
Brazilian people of Portuguese descent
Brazilian people of indigenous peoples descent
Brazilian film actresses
Brazilian television actresses
Brazilian telenovela actresses